Gerhard Fankhauser (1901–1981) was an embryologist known for his studies on amphibian development.  He was a Princeton professor from 1931 to 1969.

Fankhauser's research showed the correlation between ploidy and cell size.

In his research on Triturus viridescens, a species of newt, Fankhauser discovered that cell size was not the determining factor in the size of an organism.  In his 1945 paper, Fankhauser showed that although the nephric duct cells of polyploidy embryos are larger, the size of the duct itself remained constant

References

1901 births
1981 deaths
American embryologists
Princeton University faculty